Jozef Marko (25 May 1923 – 26 September 1996) was a Slovak football player and coach. He played for FC Spartak Trnava. He earned 9 caps for the Czechoslovakia national football team. Most notably he was the manager of the Czechoslovakia national football team in the 1970 FIFA World Cup.

International career
Marko made nine appearances for the full Czechoslovakia national football team.

References

1923 births
1996 deaths
Czechoslovak footballers
Slovak footballers
Czechoslovakia international footballers
FC Spartak Trnava players
Slovak football managers
Czechoslovak football managers
Czechoslovakia national football team managers
1970 FIFA World Cup managers
FC Spartak Trnava managers
MŠK Žilina managers
Sportspeople from Topoľčany
FK Inter Bratislava managers
Association football midfielders